Thomas James Jenkinson (born 21 April 1865) was a Scottish footballer, who played as a right winger.

Career
Born in Edinburgh, Jenkinson played club football for Hearts and Liverpool, and scored on his sole appearance for Scotland in 1887. He later emigrated to Australia.

References

1865 births
Year of death missing
Scottish footballers
Scotland international footballers
Heart of Midlothian F.C. players
Liverpool F.C. players
Association football wingers
Place of death missing
Footballers from Edinburgh